Port of Subs, Inc. is an American regional submarine sandwich shop chain headquartered in Reno, Nevada. The Port of Subs franchise has about 145 locations open. The chain only operates in the western United States.

History
The Larsen family founded the chain under the name "Sub Shop" in 1972 in Sparks, Nevada. John Larsen purchased the company in 1975 and renamed it Port of Subs after holding a community-wide contest for its new name. Between 1975 and 1985, ten more shops were established before Port of Subs became a regional franchise. The shop currently has more than 140 locations throughout the western United States. It can be found in Nevada, California, Utah, Arizona, Idaho, Oregon and Washington.  The name “Port of Subs” came from a sponsored contest for a new name, which received more than 10,000 entries.

See also
 List of submarine sandwich restaurants

References

External links 

 

Restaurants in Nevada
Economy of the Northwestern United States
Economy of the Southwestern United States
Companies based in Reno, Nevada
Regional restaurant chains in the United States
Fast-food chains of the United States
Submarine sandwich restaurants
Fast-food franchises
1975 establishments in Nevada